

372001–372100 

|-id=024
| 372024 Ayapani ||  || Ayapani is the local name for the beautiful feathers of the crested serpent eagles, when they are adults and fly away at New Year. || 
|}

372101–372200 

|-bgcolor=#f2f2f2
| colspan=4 align=center | 
|}

372201–372300 

|-bgcolor=#f2f2f2
| colspan=4 align=center | 
|}

372301–372400 

|-id=305
| 372305 Bourdeille ||  || Christian Bourdeille (born 1958) is the founding president of Uranoscope de l´Ile de France, an astronomical observatory open to the public since 1983 in Gretz Armainvilliers (France). He is also the founding president of Uranoscope de France created in 1995 with the fundamental goal of developing international relations between amateur and professional astronomers worldwide. || 
|}

372401–372500 

|-bgcolor=#f2f2f2
| colspan=4 align=center | 
|}

372501–372600 

|-id=573
| 372573 Pietromenga ||  || Pietro Menga (born 1943), active on a voluntary basis in environmental policies, has contributed to Italian initiatives on sustainable energy use and on the protection of the night sky. || 
|-id=578
| 372578 Khromov ||  || Gavriil Sergeevich Khromov (1937–2014), a Russian astronomer and organizer of science. || 
|}

372601–372700 

|-id=626
| 372626 IGEM ||  || IGEM, the Institute of Ore Geology, Petrography, Mineralogy and Geochemistry within the Russian Academy of Sciences (RAS) || 
|}

372701–372800 

|-bgcolor=#f2f2f2
| colspan=4 align=center | 
|}

372801–372900 

|-bgcolor=#f2f2f2
| colspan=4 align=center | 
|}

372901–373000 

|-bgcolor=#f2f2f2
| colspan=4 align=center | 
|}

References 

372001-373000